The 2007–08 All-Ireland Junior Club Football Championship was the seventh staging of the All-Ireland Junior Club Football Championship since its establishment by the Gaelic Athletic Association.

The All-Ireland final was played on 17 February 2008 at Croke Park in Dublin, between Canovee and Rock St Patrick's. Canovee won the match by 1-08 to 0-05 to claim their first ever championship title.

All-Ireland Junior Club Football Championship

All-Ireland semi-finals

All-Ireland final

References

2007 in Irish sport
2008 in Irish sport
All-Ireland Junior Club Football Championship
All-Ireland Junior Club Football Championship